Neptidopsis fulgurata, the barred false sailer or Malagasy sailer, is a butterfly in the family Nymphalidae. It is found in Kenya, Tanzania, Mozambique and Madagascar. The habitat consists of coastal forests and coastal forest-savanna mosaic.

Adults are attracted to fermented bananas and have been recorded feeding from the tips of tall grass. They are on wing from April to September.

Subspecies
Neptidopsis fulgurata fulgurata — Madagascar
Neptidopsis fulgurata platyptera Rothschild & Jordan, 1903 — Kenya, Tanzania and Mozambique

References

Butterflies described in 1833
Biblidinae
Taxa named by Jean Baptiste Boisduval